Alcindo Martha de Freitas (31 March 1945 – 27 August 2016), known simply as Alcindo, was a Brazilian footballer who played as a midfielder.

Career
During his club career he played for Rio Grande (1963), Grêmio (1964–1971), Santos (1971–1973), Club Jalisco (1973) and Club América (1974–76) of Mexico, and Francana (1978). Alcindo is Grêmio's all-time leading scorer with 636 career goals for the club.

He was part of the Brazilian team for the 1966 FIFA World Cup. In total he earned 7 caps and scored 1 goal for Brazil. His brother Alfeu played for San Lorenzo de Almagro, in Argentina. He died from complications of diabetes on 27 August 2016.

References

External links

 

1945 births
2016 deaths
Brazilian footballers
Brazil international footballers
Brazilian expatriate footballers
1966 FIFA World Cup players
Grêmio Foot-Ball Porto Alegrense players
Santos FC players
Club América footballers
Liga MX players
Expatriate footballers in Mexico
Association football midfielders